Anthracites may refer to:

 Anthracites (katydid), a katydid genus in the tribe Agraeciini
 Anthracite, a hard, compact variety of coal with a submetallic luster